Abbé (from Latin abbas, in turn from Greek , abbas, from Aramaic abba, a title of honour, literally meaning "the father, my father", emphatic state of abh, "father") is the French word for an abbot. It is the title for lower-ranking Catholic clergy in France.

History
A concordat between Pope Leo X and King Francis I of France (1516) gave the kings of France the right to nominate 255 commendatory abbots for almost all French abbeys, who received income from a monastery without needing to render service, creating, in essence, a sinecure. 

From the mid-16th century, the title of abbé has been used in France for all young clergy, with or without consecration. Their clothes consisted of black or dark violet robes with a small collar, and they were tonsured.

Since such abbés only rarely commanded an abbey, they often worked in upper-class families as tutors, spiritual directors, etc.; some (such as Gabriel Bonnot de Mably) became writers.

Clerical oblates and seminarians of the Institute of Christ the King Sovereign Priest also have the honorific title of abbé.

See also
Abbot#Modern abbots not as superior
Abbé Pierre
Abbé Faria
Abbé Sieyès
Abbé Franz Liszt 
Abbé Edgeworth de Firmont

Notes

References

External links